Meridian High School is a public four-year high school located in Macon, Illinois. It is located about nine miles south of Decatur, Illinois. Its first year of existence was the fall of 1994, when it was formed by the merger of the Macon School District (1927–1994) and the Blue Mound School District (1917–1994). It is now part of the Meridian Community School District #15, which includes Meridian Middle School (grades 6-8) and Meridian High School (grades 9-12) in Macon, and Meridian Elementary School (grades Pre-K-5) in Blue Mound.

The Meridian school district includes the towns of Macon, Blue Mound, Boody, Elwin, and some areas in the southern tip of Decatur.

In 2011, with the help of a one percent sales tax increase for Macon County and a grant from the state of Illinois, Meridian residents decided to change the Macon and Blue Mound campuses. Meridian High School would become the new Meridian Jr./Sr. High School, housing grades 6-12. A new wing and gym would be added, and a new football and baseball field would be constructed. Meridian Middle School would be torn down (except for the gymnasium) and a new school constructed in its place which would serve as the new elementary school (Pre-K-5).

Sports
On June 4, 1971, the Macon Ironmen baseball team finished in second place at the Illinois High School Association Boys Baseball Championship Tournament.  The story of this feat has been retold in a 2012 book titled “One Shot at Forever: A Small Town, an Unlikely Coach, and a Magical Baseball Season” by Sports Illustrated writer Chris Ballard.   Brian Snitker, a member of that team, worked for the Atlanta Braves (third base coach, 2006-2013 and manager, beginning May 2016, which then he won Manager of the Year in 2018). and the 2021 World Series.

In November 1986, the Macon Ironmen football team took second place in the IHSA Class 1A State Playoffs.

In November 1999, the Meridian Hawks placed second in the IHSA 2A Football Championship.

On May 27, 2006, Meridian Hawks' Rodney Oyler was the first individual IHSA Boys State Champion in the open 800-meter run.

On March 14, 2009, Meridian Hawks won the IHSA Boys Class 1A Basketball Championship.

Notable alumni
Dale Connelly, who succeeded Garrison Keillor as co-host of Minnesota Public Radio's Morning Show, is a 1973 graduate of Macon High School
Lauren Doyle, represented the United States of America for Rugby sevens at the 2016 Summer Olympics
 Brian Snitker, 2021 World Series winning manager of the Atlanta Braves, member of the 1971 Mod Squad, and a 1973 graduate of Macon High School
 Toby Towson, NCAA Gymnastics Champion, coach and dancer, a 1965 graduate of Macon High School.

References

http://www.ihsa.org/SportsActivities/BoysTrackField/RecordsHistory.aspx

External links
 Meridian High School’s Official Website

Public high schools in Illinois
Educational institutions established in 1994
Schools in Macon County, Illinois
1994 establishments in Illinois